Raffaele "Lele" Pinto (13 April 1945 – 8 December 2020) was a rally driver, who won the 1974 Rally Portugal.

Career
Pinto began rallying in 1968. In 1972, he won the European Rally Championship in a Fiat 124 Sport Spider. The following year, the World Rally Championship was run for the first time, and Pinto competed with Fiat, winning the 1974 Rally Portugal. For 1975, he moved to Lancia, where he remained until the end of 1977, driving the legendary Lancia Stratos HF.

WRC victories
{|class="wikitable"
! # 
!Event
!Season
!Co-driver
!Car
|-
|1
| 8th Rally de Portugal
|1974
|Arnaldo Bernacchini
|Fiat Abarth 124 Rallye
|}

References

External links
World Rally Archive
Rallybase

1945 births
2020 deaths
World Rally Championship drivers
European Rally Championship drivers
Italian rally drivers